Mireille Capitaine is a French mathematician whose research focuses on random matrices and free probability theory. In 2012 she was a recipient of the G. de B. Robinson Award for a paper she coauthored that introduced free Bessel laws, a two-parameter family of generalizations of the free Poisson distribution. She received her PhD in 1996 from Paul Sabatier University, where she was advised by Michel Ledoux. She is currently a researcher for the French National Centre for Scientific Research (CNRS), associated with the Toulouse Institute of Mathematics.

References 

Year of birth missing (living people)
Living people
French mathematicians
French women mathematicians
French National Centre for Scientific Research scientists